Round Towers (Irish: Cumann an Chloigthí, Cluain Dolcáin ) is a Gaelic Athletic Association (GAA) associated with the Dublin County Board club based in Clondalkin, County Dublin. The club plays the Gaelic games of Gaelic football, hurling in both men's and women's codes.

History

In December 1884, one month after the G.A.A. was founded, a group of men gathered in Clondalkin to form a Gaelic Football Club. Among those present were David Molloy, J. Wixted, J. Carroll, J. Keogh, C. Ryder, P. Doran, The Errity Brothers one of whom, Tom, was later to win All-Ireland Senior medals with Dublin in '92', '94, '98, '99 and 1902.

Towers won their first competition, the Baltyboys Tournament in 1889. They won their first Dublin Trophy — the Junior League in 1910 with Matt Nolan as captain. They won the Junior League and Junior Championship in 1926, again with Matt Nolan as captain.

Success in the Leixlip Tournament of 1928 is noteworthy because St. Mary's Leixlip included the two Kildare "greats" Larry Stanley and Matt Goff. The Club had attained Senior status in the thirties and three of its members, Tom Dowd Paddy Hickey and Billy Dowling played for Dublin and Leinster.

The Club lost the 1941 Junior Championship but won the 1942 League to regain Senior status. They contested the Intermediate Championship finals in 1948, 1950 and 1951 and defeated O'Dwyers in the I.L.F. in 1951, and went on to win the Dublin Intermediate Football Championship in 1952.

Winners of the Under 21 Dublin Championship in its inauguration year 1964, this same team challenged strongly for senior championship honours up to 1970. G. Freyne. P. Barrett, G. Gray, D. Keating, T. Higgins and C. Dowling were all prominent members of that team. This feat was repeated 25 years later in 1989 when the club won the Under 21 A championship for the second time.

Paddy Delaney, Tony, his son, Fred Kavanagh, Michael Egan and Jim Gavin are all holders of All-Ireland medals.
Others include John O'Malley and Paddy Taylor who along with Paddy Delaney were All-Ireland Minor football Winners with Dublin in 1959.

Honours 
1952:

Dublin Intermediate Football Championship winners.

1964 and 1989:

 Dublin U21 Football A Championship

1993:

 All Ireland Football Féile Division 1 Winners

1997:

 Dublin Minor Football Championship Runners-Up
 All Ireland Football Féile Division 1 Runners-Up

2002:

 AIB Cup Winners
 Dublin AHL Div 9 Winners
 Dublin Under-16 Hurling League Div 2 Winners

2003:

 Minor Hurling B Championship Winners
 U21 Football A Championship Runners-Up

2004:
 Minor Football A Championship Winners
 Dublin Minor Football League Div 1 Winners
 Minor Hurling A Championship Winners

2005:

 Dublin Junior A Football Championship Runners-Up

2006:

 Dublin AFL Division 1 Runners-Up
 Dublin Intermediate Hurling Championship Winners

2009:

 Dublin Intermediate Hurling Championship Runners-Up

2010:

 Dublin Adult Ladies League Division 2 Winners

2011:

 Dublin Intermediate Ladies Football Championship Winners
 Dublin Minor Hurling League Division 2 Runners-Up
 Dublin Division 5 Football Féile Winners
 Dublin Under-16 Football Cup Runners-Up

2012:

 Dublin Intermediate Hurling Championship Runners-Up
 AFL Division 5 Runners-Up
 AFL Division 9 Winners
 Sheridan Cup Winners
 Dublin Div 4 Football Féile Winners
 Dublin Under-16 D Football Shield Winners
 Dublin Under-15 C Football Shield Winners

2013:

 AIB Cup Runners-Up
 Junior E Hurling Championship Runners-Up
 Dublin U14 Div 4 Football League Winners
 Dublin U16 Div 5 Football League Winners
 Dublin U13 Div 9 Football League Winners
 Dublin U16 Ladies Div 2 Football League Winners

2014:

 Dublin AHL Division 4 Winners
 AFL Division 8 Winners
 Dublin Senior B Football Championship Runners-Up
 Dublin Junior C Football Championship Runners-Up
 Dublin Senior 7 Camogie Championship Winners
 Dublin Under-14 Div 4 Camogie League Winners
 Dublin Under-14 Camogie 'D' Championship Winners
 Dublin Div 4 Camogie Féile Runners-Up
 Dublin Under-13 Ladies Football Div 5 Cup Runners-Up
 Dublin Under-13 Ladies Football  Div 6 Runners-Up

2015:

 Corn Ceitin Cup Runners-Up
 Dublin AHL Div 9 Winners
 Dublin Under-14 Div 3 Football League Winners
 Dublin Under-14 Div 2 Hurling League Runners-Up
 Dublin Under-14 Div 5 Ladies Football Championship Runners-Up

2016:

 Dublin AHL Div 8 Winners
 Dublin Adult Ladies League Div 3 Runners-Up
 Dublin Under-16 'C' Football Championship Winners
 Dublin Under-16 Div 5 Football League Winners
 Dublin Under-15 Ladies Football Div 4 Winners

2017:

 Dublin Under-14 Ladies Football Div 4 Féile Winners
 Dublin Under-13 Div 5 Hurling League Winners
 Dublin Div 4 Camogie Féile Runners-Up
 Dublin Under-13 Div 5 Ladies Football Cup Runners-Up
 Dublin Under-15 'C' Hurling Championship Runners-Up
 Dublin Under-16 Div 3 Football League Winners

2018:

 Dublin Div 5 Hurling Féile Winners
 Dublin Under-13 Hurling Div 3 Winners
 Dublin Under-14 Hurling Div 4 Runners-up
 Dublin Under-16 Hurling Div 3 Winners
 Dublin Under-17 Ladies Football Div 3 Shield Winners
 Dublin Under-15 Ladies Football Div 4 Winners
 Dublin Under-15 Ladies Football Div 3 Championship Winners
 Dublin Under-13 Ladies Football Div 5 Cup Winners
 Dublin Under-13 Ladies Football Div 5 Runners-Up
 Dublin Junior 4 Camogie Championship Runners-Up
 Dublin Under-15 Camogie D 3 Winners
2019:

 Dublin Intermediate Hurling Championship Winners
 Dublin Under-16 Hurling C Championship Runners-Up

2020:
 Dublin Junior 4 Camogie Championship Winners 

2021:

 Dublin Junior H Hurling Championship Runners-Up
 Dublin Junior 2 Football Championship Winners 
 Dublin Intermediate Football Championship Runners-Up 
 Dublin Under-16 Camogie Div 4 Championship Winners 
 Dublin Under-16 Camogie Div 5 League Winners 
 Dublin Under-16 Ladies Football Div 6 Championship Winners 
 Dublin U20 Camogie Div 4 Championship Winners 
 Dublin Junior 3B Camogie Championship Winners 
 Dublin Adult Ladies Div 9 Cup Winners 
 Dublin Adult Ladies League Div 9 Winners 
 Dublin Under-15 Ladies Football Div 2 Feile Shield Winners
 Dublin Under-15 Ladies Football Div 2 League Runners-Up
 Dublin Under-12 Hurling Div 1 League Joint-Winners

Notable players

Senior inter-county footballers

Senior inter-county Hurlers
Leitrim
  Joe Murray

Underdogs TG4

Stephen Barry

Others 
Ireland women's rugby union international
  Hannah Tyrrell
NFL American footballer
 Neil O'Donoghue

See also 
Dublin GAA
Dublin Senior Club Football Championship
Dublin Senior Club Hurling Championship

References

Gaelic football clubs in South Dublin (county)
Hurling clubs in South Dublin (county)
Gaelic games clubs in South Dublin (county)